"Night Surf" is a post-apocalyptic short story by Stephen King, first published in the spring 1969 issue of Ubris magazine and later collected in a revised version in King's 1978 collection Night Shift.

Plot summary
On an August night on Anson Beach, New Hampshire, a group of former college students have survived a plague caused by a virus called A6, or "Captain Trips". They believe the virus spread out of Southeast Asia and wiped out most of humanity.  

The characters' outlook is grim. They encounter a delirious man dying of the plague and burn him on a pyre as a half-serious black-magic human sacrifice. The protagonist, Bernie, reflects upon this new world and reminisces about "the time before" when he went to Anson Beach in his youth, years before the plague. All the members of Bernie's group had survived a virus called A2, which supposedly made them immune to A6. But Needles reveals to Bernie that he has contracted A6. Bernie admits to himself that deep down they know that A2 is not a guarantee against A6 and that they will probably all be dead by Christmas. Bernie's girlfriend keeps up the pretense, accepting Bernie's explanation that Needles must have lied about having A2 so the others would not leave him behind.

Film adaptation
Writer-director Peter Sullivan adapted "Night Surf" as a short film in 2001. Optioned from King for a dollar, the film is part of the Dollar Baby collection of similar short films.

See also
 Stephen King short fiction bibliography

External links
Stephen King Short Movies

1969 short stories
Horror short stories
Post-apocalyptic short stories
Short stories by Stephen King
Short stories adapted into films
Viral outbreaks in fiction
Works originally published in Ubris